Săcele (German: Siebendörfer; Hungarian: Négyfalu, between 1950 and 2001 Szecseleváros) is a city in Brașov County, Romania, in the Burzenland area of southeastern Transylvania, with a population of 30,798 inhabitants in 2011.

History
The city since 1950 is composed of former villages which now form the main sectors: Baciu (Bácsfalu, Batschendorf), Turcheș (Türkös, Türkeschdorf), Cernatu (Csernátfalu, Zerndorf), and Satulung (Hosszúfalu, Langendorf). After the second half of the 11th century the villages were  mentioned as "septem villae valacheles" (seven Vlach villages).

The first official mention of Săcele was an act issued on May 16, 1366, by the Hungarian King Ludovic I de Anjou in which he offers the area between the Timiș and Olt rivers to a trusted friend—Count Stanislav. Later it was under the Saxon management of Kronstadt (Brașov). Between the 13th and 14th centuries, an important Hungarian population settled in the region, marking the further development of the area.

During the Middle Ages three other villages belonged to the locality: Tărlungeni, Zizin, and Cărpiniș.

The Romanian name "Săcele" was first mentioned in a letter between the Wallachian Prince Vlad Călugărul (1482–1495) and the magistrate of Brașov. The Romanian etymology of "Săcele" is from "sătucele" meaning "small villages".

The German name was "Siebendörfen" which means "seven villages" and which is close to the Hungarian name "Hétfalu" or "Négyfalu". See also Seven Villages.

The inhabitants were the Mocani—local shepherds. They are mentioned in a few official documents and appear to have owned thousands of sheep, the villages being among the wealthiest in the area. They carried the local traditions across many Romanian lands due to the transhumance method of shepherding. Their customs exist to these days: the "Sîntilie" (Saint Elijah) festival, national costumes, etc.

After the Romanian Revolution of 1989, the city diversified its economy. In Săcele there are nowadays several small furniture factories, lumber-mills, as well as meat-packaging facilities.

Climate
Săcele has a warm-summer humid continental climate (Dfb in the Köppen climate classification).

Buildings and monuments
The city has 17 churches of the following denominations: Orthodox, Lutheran, Reformed, Roman Catholic.

The Orthodox Baciu Church, Turcheș Church, Cernatu Church and, in Satulung, the Dormition and Archangels churches are historic monuments.

There is a copy of the Capitoline Wolf in Săcele.

Education
Săcele houses two highs schools: the George Moroianu Theoretical High School and the István Zajzoni Rab Theoretical High School.

Sport
The local football team is FC Precizia Săcele, currently playing in Liga IV.

Population

According to the 2011 census, the town has a population of 30,798 of which 75.1% are Romanians, 23% Hungarians, 1.2% Roma, and 0.2% Germans. At the 2002 census, 69% were Romanian Orthodox, 15.2% Evangelical Lutheran, 4.9% Roman Catholic, 3.4% each Reformed, and Pentecostal, 1.1% belong to "another religion" and 0.5% Unitarian.

International relations

Săcele is twinned with:
 Vire, France
  Kisújszállás, Hungary

Gallery

Natives 
 Moise Crăciun
 George Giuglea
 Alexandru Lapedatu
 Ion Lapedatu
 Nicolae Nicoleanu
 Nicolae Popea

References

Populated places in Brașov County
Localities in Transylvania
Cities in Romania
Burzenland